Elvis Zark Hammond (born 6 October 1980) is a retired Ghanaian footballer who last played for Kingstonian as a striker.

Club career
Born in Accra (Ghana), Hammond was a product of the Fulham Academy. He made his debut for Fulham on 19 September 2000 against Chesterfield at the Recreation Ground. Hammond join Bristol Rovers on Loan for the start of 2001-02 Season in order to get first team experience. After his loan spell with Bristol Rovers, Hammond signed a one-year contract with Fulham. Hammond looked to have made his break into the first team towards the end of the 2002-03 Season, under Chris Coleman, only to have an injury put him out for the rest of that season. Despite the injury, Hammond signed a two-year contract with the club. At the beginning of the 2003-04 Season, he spent a month on Loan at Norwich City, making four league appearances during their 2003-04 Season after which they were promoted to the Premier League as First Division Champions in his absence. He joined Dutch Eredivisie side RBC Roosendaal on Loan in January 2005, where he scored twice in 14 matches playing in the Dutch Eredivisie – the top Division of Dutch Football. He then went on loan before transferring permanently to Leicester City from Fulham for a fee of £250,000 in September 2005.

He made his first start for Leicester City in a 2–2 draw away at Crewe, hitting a post late on in the game, and kept his place for the subsequent League Cup tie away at Bury, which Leicester City won 3–0.

Hammond grabbed his first Leicester City goal in a 2–1 home defeat to QPR in September 2005. He was also on target in the 3–2 victory over Tottenham Hotspur in the FA Cup third round tie later that season. He got off the mark for the 2006-07 Championship campaign in a 1–1 draw away to Birmingham City at St Andrews.

On 04 June 2007, Hammond was placed on the transfer list by his then manager Martin Allen. In May 2008, Hammond was one of six players released by the club after his contract was not renewed. Hammond joined Cheltenham Town on 11 November 2008 on a short-term contract until January 2009. Hammond left Cheltenham Town by mutual consent in March 2010. Hammond joined Sutton United later that year during October 2010, he scored on his debut against Margate. Hammond would then go on to join Woking later in that same October 2010, seeing out the season and signing a one-year contract in the summer of 2011. Hammond was released by Woking in May 2012, after having helped Woking to the Conference South Championship.

He was subsequently jailed for his role in an international money laundering scam.

International career 
Hammond received his first and only cap for Ghana against Mexico on 1 March 2006 in a pre-2006 FIFA World Cup friendly.

Career statistics

References

External links 
 
 Ghana Football Association – official website
 Career information at ex-canaries.co.uk

1980 births
Living people
Footballers from Accra
Ghana international footballers
Ghanaian footballers
Ghanaian expatriate footballers
Ghanaian expatriate sportspeople in England
RBC Roosendaal players
Bristol Rovers F.C. players
Fulham F.C. players
Leicester City F.C. players
Norwich City F.C. players
Premier League players
Eredivisie players
Cheltenham Town F.C. players
Expatriate footballers in England
Expatriate footballers in the Netherlands
Sutton United F.C. players
Woking F.C. players
Farnborough F.C. players
Hastings United F.C. players
Eastbourne Borough F.C. players
Kingstonian F.C. players
Isthmian League players
Association football forwards